Ralph Anderson (November 2, 1927 – November 30, 2019) was a Democratic member of the South Carolina Senate, representing the 7th District from 1997–2013. Prior to being elected to the State Senate, Anderson served in the South Carolina House of Representatives from 1991–1997.

Education
Ralph Anderson received his education from the following institutions:
Sterling High School (South Carolina) in Greenville
BA, Allen University, 1949
Graduate Studies, Howard University

Political Experience
Ralph Anderson had the following political experience:
Senator, South Carolina State Senate, 1997–2013
Representative, South Carolina State House of Representatives, 1991–1997
Council Member, City of Greenville, 1983–1991
Board of Directors, Greater Greenville Chamber of Commerce, 1983–1985
City of Greenville Zoning Board, 1982–1983
Commissioner, Greenville Civil Service Commission, 1969–1973

Legislative Committees
Ralph Anderson was a member of the following committees:
Corrections and Penology, Member
Education, Member
Finance, Member
Medical Affairs, Member
Transportation, Member
Caucuses/Non-Legislative Committees
Board Member, Community Planning Council
Member, Greenville Civil Service Commission
Representative of the City, Greenville Housing Authority Board

Professional Experience
Ralph Anderson had the following professional experience:
Retired
Postmaster, United States Postal Service, 1970–1983
Non-Commissioned Officer, United States Army, Fort Jackson/Germany, 1950–1952

Organizations
Ralph Anderson was a member of the following organizations:
President, Board of Directors, Phyllis Wheatley Center, 1985–1991
Member, Municipal Association of South Carolina, 1986–1988
Staffer, Family Counseling Services, 1983–1986
Board Member, Greenville YMCA, 1969–1973
Executive Member, Appalachian Council of Governments
Member, Greenville Regional Board of Directors, BB&T Bank
Board Member, Community Foundation of Greater Greensville, Incorporated
Member, Freemasons
First Vice President, Greenville Chapter, NCAAP (National Association for the Advancement of Colored People)
Member, Board of Trustees, Saint Anthony's Catholic School, Greenville
Board Member, Senior Action of Greenville County
Board Member, Sunbelt Human Advancement Resources

Retirement
On March 21, 2012, Anderson announced he would not seek re-election. He died on November 30, 2019, at age 92.

References

External links
South Carolina Legislature - Senator Ralph Anderson official SC Senate website
Project Vote Smart - Senator Ralph Anderson (SC) profile
Follow the Money — Ralph Anderson
2006 2004 2002 2000 1996 campaign contributions

1927 births
2019 deaths
20th-century American politicians
21st-century American politicians
African-American state legislators in South Carolina
Allen University alumni
South Carolina postmasters
Howard University alumni
Democratic Party members of the South Carolina House of Representatives
Military personnel from South Carolina
Politicians from Greenville, South Carolina
School board members in South Carolina
Democratic Party South Carolina state senators
South Carolina city council members
20th-century African-American politicians
African-American men in politics
21st-century African-American politicians